Federico Lionel Segovia (born 21 July 1997) is an Argentine professional footballer who plays as a midfielder for Gimnasia y Tiro.

Career
Segovia was first moved into the first-team of Primera B Nacional side Ferro Carril Oeste in May 2015, with the midfielder being an unused substitute for a Copa Argentina encounter at home to Boca Unidos. His professional bow didn't arrive until the 2018–19 season when he was picked off the bench during a fixture against Central Córdoba on 17 November 2018; another appearance came a week later versus Agropecuario.

Career statistics
.

References

External links

1997 births
Living people
Footballers from Rosario, Santa Fe
Argentine footballers
Association football midfielders
Primera Nacional players
Ferro Carril Oeste footballers
Gimnasia y Tiro footballers